Cape Fear Museum of History and Science is a museum located at 814 Market Street in downtown Wilmington in southeastern North Carolina. Founded in 1898, it is the oldest history museum in the state.

Museum scope
The Cape Fear Museum was founded in 1898 by the local chapter of the United Daughters of the Confederacy to preserve artifacts relating to the Civil War.  Today, it is owned and operated by New Hanover County New Hanover, North Carolina. The Museum moved to its current location in 1970.  The Museum's building is a combination of an historic structure—a 1930s Works Progress Administration armory—and a 1990s expansion.

The museum has a collection of more than fifty two thousand artifacts, the vast majority of which are in storage.  The Museum currently collects artifacts relating to the history, science, and cultures of the Lower Cape Fear, defined as a 50-mile radius around the city of Wilmington. In addition to New Hanover, the adjacent counties are Brunswick and Pender. The extended region encompasses portions of Columbus, Bladen, Sampson, Duplin, and Onslow counties.

Exhibits
On the first floor of the Museum, visitors can explore The Michael Jordan  Discovery Gallery which examines the region's ecosystems.  There are natural history displays, with a section on native plants and wildlife in the region, such as deer,  beavers, foxes, a woodpeckers, and the unique Venus flytrap carnivorous plant.  The weather is also discussed.

There is a small exhibit on Michael Jordan, the basketball superstar from Wilmington. 
Visitors can also see a Simmons Sea-skiff, a locally built boat in the lobby.  And, castings of the bones of a Giant Ground Sloth are on display.

The lobby also includes the "Arrivals" exhibit which showcases the varied ways people experienced arriving in the Lower Cape Fear over time.  The Museum's main exhibit, Cape Fear Stories starts on the first floor.  The first section of the exhibition, Land of the Longleaf Pine, examines the history of the region from the first inhabitants through the American Revolution.  The exhibits then explore the 19th century, including the American Civil War, and, after visitors go upstairs, they can learn about the history of the racial violence that wracked the city in 1898, about segregation, and learn some of the region's 20th century stories.

The Museum also hosts traveling exhibits and temporary exhibits.  Currently (August 2015) the Museum's temporary exhibits were all researched, curated, designed and fabricated by the Museum's staff.  The exhibits are Reflections in Black and White, and Make it Work, an exhibit about simple machines and maritime work  An in-house exhibit on Smoking is on display in the Collections Selection space.

References

External links
 Cape Fear Museum website

History museums in North Carolina
Natural history museums in North Carolina
Buildings and structures in Wilmington, North Carolina
Museums in New Hanover County, North Carolina
Museums established in 1898
1898 establishments in North Carolina
Institutions accredited by the American Alliance of Museums